Winchester Cathedral is the third studio album by indie rock band Clinic. It was released in 2004 via Domino Records.

Track listing
 "Country Mile" – 3:19
 "Circle of Fifths" – 3:24
 "Anne" – 3:35
 "The Magician" – 2:41
 "Vertical Take Off in Egypt" – 2:13
 "Home" – 3:13
 "W.D.Y.Y.B." – 2:19
 "The Majestic #2" – 3:09
 "Falstaff" – 3:35
 "August" – 2:37
 "Thank You (For Living)" – 3:15
 "Fingers" – 3:26

Singles
"The Magician" (12 July 2004)
"Circle of Fifths" (22 November 2004)

Personnel
Ade Blackburn – Keyboard, Melodica, Lead Vocals
Brian Campbell – Bass, Flute, Backing Vocals
Hartley – Lead Guitar, Clarinet, Keyboards
Carl Turney – Drums, Piano, Backing Vocals, Additional Percussion

References

External links

2004 albums
Clinic (band) albums
Domino Recording Company albums